"Rejoice" may refer to

Music
 Rejoice Broadcast Network, a Christian radio network
 Rejoice Records

Albums
 Rejoice (The Emotions album)
 Rejoice (Katherine Jenkins album) (2007)
 Rejoice (Pharoah Sanders album) (1981)
 Rejoice (2nd Chapter of Acts album) (1981)
 Rejoice, a 2008 album by Sawyer Brown
Rejoice (Tony Allen and Hugh Masekela album)

Songs
 "Rejoice" (Il Divo song) (2005)
 "Rejoice", a 2007 Andrew Jackson Jihad song from People That Can Eat People Are the Luckiest People in the World
 "Rejoice", a 1971 song by Rod Argent from Ring of Hands
 "Rejoice", a 2001 song by Audio Adrenaline from Lift
 "Rejoice", a 2015 song by Audio Adrenaline from Sound of the Saints
 "Rejoice", a 2014 song by Devin Townsend Project from Z²
 "Rejoice", a 1981 song by U2 from October

Other uses
"Rejoice" (Margaret Thatcher), a 1982 remark made by the British prime minister

See also